Robert Alphonso Taft III  (born January 8, 1942) is an American politician and attorney, who served as the 67th governor of Ohio from 1999 to 2007 as a member of the Republican Party.

A member of the Taft political dynasty, Taft served first in the Ohio House of Representatives (1976–1981), then as Hamilton County commissioner (1981–1990), next as Ohio Secretary of State (1991–1999, under George Voinovich), and then as governor.  He was involved in several controversies, including Coingate, and was convicted of accepting illegal campaign contributions.

After leaving office, Taft worked for the University of Dayton, beginning August 15, 2007.

Personal background
Taft was born in 1942 in Boston, to U.S. Senator Robert Taft Jr. and Blanca Duncan Noel. Bob's paternal grandfather was U.S. Senate Majority Leader Robert Alphonso Taft Sr.; his patrilineal great-grandfather was U.S. President and Chief Justice of the United States William Howard Taft; and his patrilineal great-great-grandfather was Attorney General and Secretary of War Alphonso Taft.

He was raised in Cincinnati, Ohio, where he attended the Cincinnati Country Day School through the ninth grade and graduated from The Taft School. At Yale University, he was a member of the Yale Political Union, and graduated with a B.A. in government in 1963. From 1963 to 1965, he served as a Peace Corps volunteer, teaching in Tanzania.  He later attended the Woodrow Wilson School of Public and International Affairs at Princeton University, receiving an M.A. in government in 1967. In 1976, he received his Juris Doctor from the University of Cincinnati College of Law.

Early political career

Taft was elected as a Republican to the Ohio House of Representatives from 1976 to 1981, and then was Hamilton County commissioner from 1981 to 1990. He ran for Lieutenant Governor of Ohio on the ticket with Jim Rhodes in 1986, but was unsuccessful. In 1990, he was elected Ohio Secretary of State, defeating incumbent Democrat Sherrod Brown. He was re-elected in 1994, defeating Democratic candidate Dan Brady.

Governor of Ohio
Taft was elected Governor of Ohio in 1998, defeating Democrat Lee Fisher 50-45 percent, and was re-elected in 2002, defeating Democrat Tim Hagan 58-38 percent.

Third Frontier
The Third Frontier program, started under the Taft administration, as of 2009 was considered an enormous success in modernizing Ohio's 21st century economy. The program focuses on issuing funding for research, development, and commercialization projects to the biomedical, alternative energy, and the advanced propulsion industries and institutions, among others. Between 2003-2008 it dispersed $681 million, resulting in a $6.6 billion economic impact return and 41,300 jobs.

Governor's Cup awards
During Taft's tenure, Ohio was awarded the Governor's Cup twice, in 2003 and 2006. The award, selected by Site Selection Magazine, is given to the state that attracts the most business developments over $1 million, creates over 50 jobs, or constructs over 20,000 new square feet of business area during the course of a year. The honor is deemed as being considered the best state in the country for business development, attraction, and capital investment.

Center for Stem Cell and Regenerative Medicine
In 2003, the state awarded $19.4 million for the creation of the Center for Stem Cell and Regenerative Medicine. Taft personally delivered the award to the institution in Cleveland. The state awarded another $8 million in 2006 from their Biomedical Research Research and Commercialization Program, which the Taft administration contributed to creating through the Third Frontier program. By 2009, the center had become recognized as a regional leader and had spun off four companies, conducted 51 clinical trials, treated over 250 patients with adult stem cells, and treated over 60 patients with other cell therapies.

Education
When the Taft administration took over, the state was faced with an education crisis as nearly half of students were failing mandatory tests and were attending failing districts. Taft's "Rebuilding Ohio Schools" was an ambitious project that would pour $10 billion over 12 years into new school construction. The Taft administration ultimately presided over the largest increase in education funding in state history. According to the U.S. Department of Education, Ohio student scores increased during Taft's tenure, including 4th and 8th grade math scores every period, with Ohio students scoring above the national average every period in every subject. The number of high school graduates increased, and for the 2006-2007 school year Ohio produced the most advanced percentage of 8th grade science students in the country.

Taft signed legislation creating the Ohio Educational Choice Scholarship Pilot Program, which extended choice to students in failing schools, and the Ohio College Opportunity Grant, which extended grants to 11,000 new students.

Tort reform
In January 2003, Taft signed Ohio Senate Bill 281 into law, which limited non-economic damages in medical injury lawsuits. The bill limited non-economic damages to $350,000 and imposed a statute of limitations. Taft then signed Ohio Senate Bill 80, introduced by Sen. Steve Stivers, into law in January 2005, which placed further caps on lawsuit awards in general.

Veterans affairs
In December 2000, Taft signed House Bill 408, which designated Interstate 76 as the "Military Order of the Purple Heart Memorial Highway". In July 2001, he signed legislation to permit school districts to award high school diplomas to veterans of World War II from the United States who were called into service before obtaining their diploma. In November 2001, with the ensuing War on Terror set to begin, Taft signed Ohio Senate Bill 164, called the Military Pay Bill, into law. The bill protected the benefits of state employees called into full-time active service. In 2003, he signed Ohio Senate Bill 47, introduced by Sen. Steve Stivers, which provided additional time to soldiers on active duty to pay their property taxes, interest free. In 2004, he signed legislation renaming the "Michael A. Fox Highway" to the "Butler County Veterans Highway", and proclaimed November to be "Hire a Veteran Month" in Ohio.

In 2005, Taft signed legislation creating the Military Injury Relief Fund, which allowed taxpayers to donate a portion of their tax refund to help fund grants for injured veterans. He successfully lobbied, along with others, in 2006 to have the Royal Netherlands Air Force join the Ohio Air National Guard in training missions in Springfield. Taft signed numerous other pieces of legislation extending benefits to service members, and in 2006 was honored with the National Guard Association of the United States' Charles Dick Medal of Merit, in which the press release stated "Taft fought to ensure that Ohio's Soldiers, Airmen and their families were
cared for in all aspects of their service, and presided over an unprecedented expansion of state
benefits for Guardmembers and their families." Ohio's adjuntant general Maj. Gen. Gregory L. Wayt stated about Taft that "he epitomizes what a commander-in-chief of a National Guard should be. During his term he
has stood strong with the National Guard."

His wife, Hope, started the "On the Ohio Homefront" initiative, which is an online database of businesses and charities that provide discounts and services catered toward veterans.

Highway construction

In 2003, Taft unveiled his "Jobs and Progress Plan", which was a $5 billion, 10-year agenda to improve Ohio's highways and roads. Among the notable projects were the $97 million Wilmington Bypass project, the $1 billion Cleveland Inner Belt project, and the $220 million Veterans' Glass City Skyway in Toledo.

Taxes
In 2003, Taft signed legislation enacting the largest tax increase in state history, a temporary two-year, 1% sales tax which generated $2.9 billion in revenue during the national recession. In 2005, Taft signed major tax reform, including a 21% personal income tax cut over five years, a reduction of the sales tax by 0.5%, elimination of the corporate franchise tax over five years, and the elimination of the personal tangible property tax over four years. The legislation also included nominal tax credit increases, including $50 for personal and dependent exemptions, and $88 in deductions for deposits made into Ohio Medical Savings Accounts. In 2006, Taft signed Substitute House Bill 49, which provided a 25% tax credit for historic rehabilitation projects.

Alternative energy and Energy Action Plan
In 2001, Taft, along with other state leaders, met in Cleveland to unify in calling on the U.S. Congress to grant a funding request for the NASA Glenn Research Center, which was researching projects that included alternative and more efficient energy, and to designate NASA Glenn for the leadership role in biotechnology research. ODOT had been using alternative fuels since 1999, and owned 193 flex-fuel vehicles when this announcement was made. Taft also mandated that ethanol tanks be constructed at all new ODOT facilities. Later in 2005, Taft urged the U.S. Congress to extend tax credits to those who install fuel cell electricity stations. As part of the Ohio Third Frontier program, $100 million in grants had already been issued for the research of fuel cells.

The plan also called for $25 million from the Energy Loan Fund to be set aside over five years for wind turbine producing companies, and to set aside a grant of 1.2 cents per kilowatt-hour of electricity produced by wind energy. Taft called for a pilot program to create jet fuel from coal, moving Ohio's geological information on fossil fuel sources to digital formats, and reaffirming the state's commitment to FutureGen, a clean coal initiative.

Between 1998 and 2007, Ohio's green industry sector grew at the fourth highest rate in the country, 7.3%.

Great Lakes initiatives
Taft spent considerable time during his administration promoting the Great Lakes, which included lobbying the U.S. Congress for funding devoted to restoration projects, and signing pacts that included 8 Great Lakes states and 2 Canadian provinces to preserve the area. These pacts included  "The Strategy to Restore and Protect the Great Lakes", which called for a $20 billion investment, cleanup, and renewal of the lakes, "The Great Lakes-St. Lawrence River Basin Sustainable Water Resources Agreement", which aimed to prevent new damage to the region, and "The Great Lakes-St. Lawrence River Basin Water Resources Compact". In 2001, Taft agreed to "Annex 2001", an addition to the Great Lakes Charter. In 2008, he joined the Board of Directors of the Alliance for the Great Lakes to help promote effective implementation of the Compact.

Amy's Law
In May 2005, Taft signed House Bill 29, also known as Amy's Law into law, tightening restrictions on bond for suspects accused of domestic violence.

Criticisms

Concealed carry 
In February 2006 Taft vetoed legislation passed by both houses of the Ohio General Assembly removing the 'Plain Sight' provision from the state's concealed carry law. The bill would have also kept The Plain Dealer from publishing the names and home addresses of licensees.  Nevertheless, this provision passed into law when the General Assembly overrode his veto, the first veto override in Ohio in over 30 years.

Spending and economy 
Taft was criticized during his tenure for permitting state spending and state taxes to rise. Critics also argued that Taft was responsible for the lagging Ohio economy during that time period, despite federal trade policies that were out of his control, resulting in the loss of 13,432 employment positions to international trade alone in 2006, and 71,242 employment positions lost overall between 1995-2006. Those figures are based on the Trade Adjustment Assistance Program figures, which has stringent standards that do not count all the employment positions truly lost to international trade.

Capital punishment 
Taft presided over the reintroduction of capital punishment in Ohio. During his term, 24 people were put to death by lethal injection, which made Ohio the first outside the South by number of performed executions. Taft, however, granted one commutation.

Naral v. Taft 
Taft was the subject of a federal lawsuit in 2005, NARAL v. Taft, over his decision to allow "Choose Life" license plates to be sold by the state to raise funds for pregnancy crisis centers and adoption centers. They were considered by the American Civil Liberties Union to be "viewpoint discrimination", thus unconstitutional. The district court dismissed the ACLU's lawsuit, and they later withdrew their appeal from the 6th Circuit Court of Appeals.

Criminal Convictions

Coingate scandal
In 1996, the Republican-controlled Ohio General Assembly passed a law that struck the requirement that the Ohio state government invest solely in bonds. Various fund managers and other brokers then scrambled to offer their services.

During Taft's Tenure, the Ohio Bureau of Workers' Compensation (BWC) invested hundreds of millions of dollars in high risk or unconventional investment vehicles run by Republican Party supporters who had made large campaign contributions to senior Ohio Republican officials. One was a rare coin investment fund run by Tom Noe which attracted particular scrutiny since two coins worth more than $300,000 were reportedly lost.

Further investigation into GOP operative Noe revealed that coins backed by state investments worth $10–$12 million were missing and that only $13 million of the original $50 million invested could be accounted for. Tom Noe was convicted of running a criminal enterprise, the theft of $13 million from the fund, and of keeping a second set of books to cover for it.

The Ohio Bureau of Workers' Compensation (BWC) ultimately invested hundreds of millions of dollars in high risk or unconventional investment vehicles run by people closely connected to the Ohio Republican Party who had made large campaign contributions to many senior Republican party officials.

Taft's conviction was grounds under the Ohio Constitution for impeachment and removal from office by the Ohio General Assembly; however, impeachment proceedings did not occur and Taft remained in office until the end of his second term.

Criminal golf games
In 2001, a ruling by the Ohio Ethics Commission made clear that any free rounds of golf paid for by lobbyists which were valued over $75 were to be disclosed. Taft stated he was not aware of the opinion until 2005 after news reports surfaced about the Coingate scandal. In a 2003 questionnaire for a possible appointment to the Ohio Turnpike Commission, Thomas Noe, at the center of the Coingate investigation, indicated to Taft he was not doing business with the state, although he had been. Taft personally notified the commission of possible disclosure failures, and offered his cooperation in correcting the issues in voluntarily triggering an investigation.

On August 17, 2005, Taft was charged with four criminal misdemeanors stemming from his failure to disclose golf outings paid for by lobbyists, as well as some undisclosed gifts. The Associated Press reported the total value of at least 52 undisclosed gifts as about US$5,800, they included:
Two undisclosed gifts including golf with coin dealer Thomas Noe, a Republican fundraiser then under investigation, and later convicted, for his handling of a $50 million investment of state money in rare coins, and diverting $2 million to personal use. Taft claimed of Tom Noe that "He fooled people from one end of Ohio to the other." (See Coingate scandal.)
Six undisclosed gifts including golf outings with political strategist Curt Steiner and Robert Massie, president of chemical information services giant CAS, worth $700. Taft later lobbied the U.S. Department of Health and Human Services against expanding scientific directories that would compete with CAS.
Undisclosed gifts including dinner and Columbus Blue Jackets hockey tickets from Jerry Jurgeson, chief executive officer of Nationwide Insurance
A book and artwork from the consul general of the People's Republic of China worth $100
A photograph and framed medal from the Defense Supply Center worth $85
A portfolio and clothing worth $119 from the Youngstown/Warren Regional Chamber of Commerce.

This was the first time an Ohio governor has ever been charged with a crime while in office.

At his arraignment in Franklin County Municipal Court in Columbus on August 18, Taft pleaded no contest and was fined $4,000 plus court costs. Judge Mark Froehlich also ordered Taft to apologize to the people of Ohio as well as state employees. Taft was quoted after sentencing stating "I offer my sincere and heartfelt apology, and I hope the people will understand that these mistakes, though major and important mistakes, were done unintentionally, and I hope and pray they will accept my apology." During the sentencing it was noted that Taft had a 30-year unblemished record as a public official.

In addition to the criminal sanctions, Taft was issued a public reprimand by the Ohio Supreme Court on December 27, 2006 for accepting and failing to report gifts and golf outings worth more than $6,000. This reprimand was attached to Taft's license to practice law in Ohio.

Ethics reform
After the fallout from his conviction, Taft called for a ban on executive-level government officials from accepting gifts of any amount from lobbyists.

Polling
In the wake of convictions for the ethics violations (see criminal conviction), Taft's approval rating bottomed out at 6.5%, according to a late November 2005 poll by Zogby, giving him quite possibly the lowest polled approval rating ever by a United States politician. A SurveyUSA poll that same month gave Taft a rating of 18 percent. A late-2005 article in Time named him as one of the three worst governors in the country.

Ohio Republican losses
Due to term limits for the Ohio governorship, Taft was ineligible to run for a third consecutive term. According to a University of North Carolina at Chapel Hill online database, Taft was the most unpopular governor in Ohio history. Taft's unpopularity contributed to major Democratic gains in the 2006 election, including the defeat of Republican Ken Blackwell by Democrat Ted Strickland in the race to replace Taft as governor.

Post-gubernatorial activities
After Taft left the governorship, he and his wife made a trip to Tanzania in February 2007 where he had served as a Peace Corps volunteer. Taft said the trip was invigorating and that the buildings where he taught and lived 40 years earlier were still there.

Taft joined the University of Dayton in August 2007 as a distinguished research associate for educational excellence. His job is to help the university launch the Center for Educational Excellence, which encourages students to study science, technology, engineering, and math. "We've got to figure out how to get more students in college, and that's a challenge that I really look forward to." Thomas Lasley II, dean of the School of Education and Allied Professions, stated Taft was the first professional who refused his salary offer for being too high. Lasley was quoted "I think the more people have gotten to know him [Taft] the more they realize he is a very ethical individual".

In November 2008, he joined the Board of Directors of the Alliance for the Great Lakes to help advance Great Lakes education and policy initiatives, such as the Great Lakes-St. Lawrence Basin Water Resources Compact, started during his tenure as Chairman of the Council of Great Lakes Governors.

, he is on the board of directors for Battelle for Kids, a not-for-profit organization dedicated to moving education forward for students by supporting the educators who work with them every day.

Taft is a member of the ReFormers Caucus of Issue One.

Family
The Taft family has been involved in Republican politics for over a century. Bob Taft's patrilineal great-great-grandfather Alphonso Taft was Secretary of War, Attorney General, and an Ambassador. His patrilineal great-grandfather William Howard Taft was President and Chief Justice of the United States; patrilineal great-grandmother Helen Louise "Nellie" Taft was First Lady. Paternal grandfather Robert Alphonso Taft, Sr. and father Robert Alphonso Taft, Jr. were both U.S. Senators. First cousin William Howard Taft IV acted as Secretary of Defense for two months in 1989. Uncle William Howard Taft III was an Ambassador. His patrilineal great-granduncle Charles Phelps Taft was a U.S. Representative from Ohio and, for a time, an owner of the Chicago Cubs baseball team. Patrilineal great-great-great-grandfather Peter Rawson Taft I was a member of the Vermont legislature. Other prominent relatives include Seth Chase Taft, Charles Phelps Taft II, Peter Rawson Taft II, Henry Waters Taft, Walbridge Smith Taft, and Horace Dutton Taft. Kingsley Arter Taft was a U.S. Senator from Ohio and Chief Justice of the Ohio Supreme Court.

Legacy
The Taft Coliseum at the Ohio Expo Center and State Fair in Columbus, Ohio, was renamed in honor of Taft on July 28, 2010.

See also

 Taft family

References

External links

 

1942 births
20th-century American lawyers
20th-century American politicians
21st-century American politicians
American people of English descent
American people of Scotch-Irish descent
American United Methodists
Republican Party governors of Ohio
Living people
Republican Party members of the Ohio House of Representatives
Ohio lawyers
Ohio politicians convicted of crimes
Peace Corps volunteers
Secretaries of State of Ohio
Taft family
University of Cincinnati College of Law alumni
University of Dayton people
Princeton School of Public and International Affairs alumni
Taft School alumni
Yale University alumni